Elisa Maria da Costa Guimarães Ferreira, GCC (born 17 October 1955) is a Portuguese politician and economist who has been serving as European Commissioner for Cohesion and Reforms in the administration of President Ursula von der Leyen since 2019. She previously served as vice-governor of the Bank of Portugal from 2016 until 2019. She was as Member of the European Parliament (MEP) for the Socialist Party; part of the Party of European Socialists between 2004 and 2016. In 2019, she was selected by Portugal to serve as a European Commissioner.

Political career

Member of the Portuguese Government, 1995–2002
Ferreira served as Minister of Environment (1995–1999) and as Minister for Planning (1999–2001) in the government of António Guterres.

Member of the European Parliament, 2004–2016

Ferreira was a Member of the European Parliament from the 2004 European election until her resignation in 2016. Throughout her time in parliament, she served as a member of the Committee on Economic and Monetary Affairs. In this capacity, she drafted the committee's own-initiative report on closer coordination of economic policies, which calls for the European Central Bank (ECB) to be granted powers to monitor “financial stability in the euro-area” and to be involved “in EU-wide macroprudential supervision of systematically important financial institutions.” She was also in charge of the parliament's report on the Macroeconomic Imbalance Procedure in 2011 and led the parliament's work on the Single Resolution Mechanism (SRM) in 2013.

From 2004 to 2014, Ferreira was a member of the parliament's delegation to the ACP–EU Joint Parliamentary Assembly. In 2015, she joined the Special Committee on Tax Rulings and Other Measures Similar in Nature or Effect.

In 2012, Ferreira was part of the Socialists and Democrats (S&D) expert “alternative troika” sent to Greece to assess what measures can be taken to spur job growth.

In addition to her committee assignments, Ferreira was a member of the European Parliament Intergroup on Long Term Investment and Reindustrialisation. She also represented the Parliament at the 2007 United Nations Climate Change Conference in Bali and the 2008 United Nations Climate Change Conference in Poznań.

Banco de Portugal, 2016–2019

In June 2016, Elisa Ferreira resigned from the European Parliament after she was nominated by the Portuguese Government to join the board of directors of the Bank of Portugal. She was replaced by Manuel dos Santos.

European Commissioner, 2019–present
On August 27, 2019, Prime-Minister António Costa announced that Ferreira had been proposed as the Portuguese commissioner  in Ursula von der Leyen's European Commission, to take office on 1 November 2019, taking the portfolio of Cohesion and Reforms. She became the first Portuguese woman to be put forward as commissioner.

Other activities

 Instituto Nacional de Estatística (INE), Member of the Administrative Board (1989–1992)
 Associação Industrial Portuense, Executive Vice-President (1992–1994)
 Comissão de Coordenação da Região Norte, Vice-President (1988–1992)

References

External links
 

1955 births
Living people
MEPs for Portugal 2004–2009
MEPs for Portugal 2009–2014
MEPs for Portugal 2014–2019
21st-century women MEPs for Portugal
People from Porto
Socialist Party (Portugal) MEPs
University of Porto alumni
Portuguese European Commissioners
Women European Commissioners
European Commissioners 2019–2024